was the final vessel of the two-ship  of armored cruisers in the Imperial Japanese Navy. Kurama was named after Mount Kurama located north of Kyoto, Japan. On 28 August 1912, the Ibukis were re-classified as battlecruisers.

Background
Ibuki was designed with geared turbine engines which promised more power and hence, more speed; however, problems with these engines led Kurama to be completed with conventional vertical triple expansion reciprocating engines. Kurama was built at Yokosuka Naval Arsenal.

Service history
Shortly after commissioning, Kurama, with Admiral Hayao Shimamura on board, was sent on a voyage to Great Britain to attend the Coronation Fleet Review for King George V at Spithead on 25 June 1911.

Kurama served in World War I as part of Japan's contribution to the Allied war effort, protecting British merchant shipping in the South Pacific, and (together with the battlecruisers  and  ) supporting the landings to occupy German-held Caroline Islands and Mariana Islands. In the 1920s, she was assigned to the northern fleet, covering the landings of Japanese troops in Russia during the Siberian Intervention in support of White Russian forces.

After the war, Kurama fell victim to the Washington Naval Treaty and was scrapped.

References

Ibuki-class battlecruisers
Ships built by Yokosuka Naval Arsenal
1907 ships
World War I battlecruisers of Japan